Methylovirgula is a Gram-negative, aerobic genus of bacteria from the family of Beijerinckiaceae.

References

Monotypic bacteria genera
Beijerinckiaceae
Bacteria genera